is a 1989 racing arcade game developed and published by Namco. It was released in North America by Atari Games, and was ported to the Mega Drive/Genesis in 1991 as Quad Challenge.

Gameplay 
Players take control of four quad bikes (red for Player 1, white for Player 2, yellow for Player 3, and green for Player 4), which are competing in an "off-road" race. They all have a preset amount of time in which to complete a full lap of the track, but for each lap of the track that is successfully completed, the players' time is extended. However, if one of the players cannot manage to successfully complete the current lap of the track before the time runs out, that player's game will instantly be over and the race will continue without them. The players must complete between three and six full laps of the track in order to win (the number is dependent on how both of the cabinets are set, as with Namco's own Final Lap). The players can also encounter between four and seven blue CPU-controlled bikes on the track, as the number is dependent on how many people are playing (seven for one player, six for two players, five for three, and four for four).

Reception and legacy

In North America, the arcade version was the top-grossing new video game on the RePlay arcade charts in April 1990. The Sega Genesis version was released with little commercial fanfare, and it never made major sales figures.

Four Trax is considered to be one of the first off-road racing games for a console system. It was released more than 10 years before ATV Offroad Fury for the PlayStation 2 brought the genre into the 21st century. However, it has become a niche genre again since THQ discontinued their MX vs. ATV series. Even prior to the cancellation of the MX vs. ATV series, driving an ATV around closed-circuit tracks never appealed much to the mainstream audience of gamers.

Notes

References

1989 video games
Arcade video games
Multiplayer and single-player video games
Namco arcade games
Racing video games
Video games developed in Japan